Wickware may refer to:

Wickware, Wisconsin, an unincorporated community in Barron County, Wisconsin, United States

People with the surname
Frank Wickware (1888–1967), American baseball player